Sivili Chuchg is a populated place situated in Pima County, Arizona, United States, very near the international border with Mexico. The name comes from the O'odham sivili chuchg, which itself borrowed siwol from Spanish, meaning "onion". The O'odham phrase means "onions standing".

References

Populated places in Pima County, Arizona